Croatia competed at the 2022 Winter Paralympics in Beijing, China which took place between 4–13 March 2022. In total, four athletes competed in three sports.

Competitors
The following is the list of number of competitors participating at the Games per sport/discipline.

Alpine skiing

Lucija Smetiško and Damir Mizdrak competed in alpine skiing.

Cross-country skiing

Josip Zima competed in cross-country skiing.

Snowboarding

One snowboarder competed in snowboarding.

Banked slalom

Snowboard cross

Qualification legend: Q - Qualify to next round; FA - Qualify to medal final; FB - Qualify to consolation final

See also
Croatia at the Paralympics
Croatia at the 2022 Winter Olympics

References

Nations at the 2022 Winter Paralympics
2022
Winter Paralympics